George Brooks may refer to:
 George Brooks (footballer, born 1887) (1887–1918), English footballer
 George Brooks (footballer, born 1892), (1892–1966), English footballer
 George M. Brooks (1824–1893), U.S. Representative from Massachusetts
 George S. Brooks (1895–1961), American playwright, author, editor and lecturer
 George Washington Brooks (1821–1882), U.S. federal judge
 George Brooks (musician) (born 1956), American jazz musician
 George Brooks (jeweler) (born 1925), jewelry designer in Canada

See also
 Brooks House (Brattleboro, Vermont), built for hotelier George Brooks
 Fort Brooks, Kansas militia fort built on land owned by Ens. George D. Brooks
 George L. Brooks School, a school building in Philadelphia, Pennsylvania
 L. Frank Baum (1856–1919), American author and actor who used the stage name George Brooks
 George Brookes (1934–2011), Tasmanian politician
 George Brooke (disambiguation)